Rajesh Bhushan is an officer of the Indian Administrative Service from the 1987 Bihar cadre.

Education
Bhushan studied History and received master's degree.

Career
Bhushan joined Indian Administrative Service in 1987. 

In July 2020 Bhushan accepted an appointment as Secretary of the Ministry of Health and Family Welfare. He presided over the functioning of the Ministry immediately after the first Covid19 wave in India and during the entire period spanning up to the devastating second wave and during that period as well. Previously in that organization he had been Special Officer on Duty since April 2020.

In November 2019 he accepted an appointment as Secretary of the Special Protection Group.

Previously Bhushan was Secretary in the Ministry of Rural Development.

Further consideration

References

Indian Administrative Service officers
Bihar cadre civil servants
Year of birth missing (living people)
Living people